Bend is the third studio album from the American hard rock band 8stops7 and the follow up to their previous, and most successful release, In Moderation.

Track listing 

 "Breathing Room" – 4:11
 "A Waking Contradiction" – 3:52
 "Here Among the Wicked" – 3:00
 "This Is Complete Surprise" – 5:37
 "Filler" – 3:25
 "Impatiently – 4:19
 "Settled-Down Spin" – 4:57
 "Fragile Accident" – 3:31
 "Need" – 6:06
 "Greetings from the Other Side" – 3:03
 "Distance and the Waving" – 4:02
 "Reasonance" – 3:39
 "To Remain Here" – 3:15
 "Counting Each Step and the Space Between" – 5:01

Personnel 

 Evan Sula-Goff (vocals, guitar)
 Seth Watson (guitar, background vocals)
 Adam Powell (drums, background vocals)
 Alex Viveros (bass, background vocals)

See also 

  8stops7 discography

References 

2006 albums
8stops7 albums